Survival of the Fittest (2015) was a two night, two city professional wrestling event produced by the U.S.-based wrestling promotion Ring of Honor, the 10th Survival of the Fittest. It took place on November 13, 2015 at the Turner Hall Ballroom in Milwaukee, Wisconsin and November 14 at the Hopkins Eisenhower Community Center in Hopkins, Minnesota.

Storylines 
Survival of The Fittest (2015) featured professional wrestling matches that involve wrestlers from pre-existing scripted feuds or storylines that play out on ROH's television program, Ring of Honor Wrestling. Wrestlers will portray heroes (faces) or villains (heels) as they follow a series of events that build tension and culminate in a wrestling match or series of matches.

Survival of the Fittest is an annual tournament held by ROH.  For the 2015 event, the winners from designated tournament matches in Milwaukee, Wisconsin advanced to a 6-Man Elimination Match the following night in Hopkins, Minnesota, and the winner of that match will be declared Survivor of the Fittest, and receive a future ROH World Championship match.

After winning a Four Corner Survival match to become the number one contender at All Star Extravaganza VII, AJ Styles will challenge reigning ROH World Champion Jay Lethal for the title in December at Final Battle.  As a prelude to that match, Lethal - along with his House of Truth teammates Donovan Dijak and Joey Daddiego - wrestled Styles and his Bullet Club teammates The Young Bucks (Nick and Matt Jackson) in a six-man tag team match during Night 1 of Survival of the Fittest, which resulted in Styles pinning Lethal with his finishing move, the Styles Clash, thus giving his team the victory.

2015 Survival of the Fittest tournament participants

 A. C. H.
 Adam Cole
 Adam Page
 Cedric Alexander
 Christopher Daniels
 Dalton Castle
 Frankie Kazarian
 Hanson
 Jay Briscoe
 Kenny King
 Mark Briscoe
 Matt Sydal
 Michael Elgin
 Moose
 Raymond Rowe
 Rhett Titus
 Roderick Strong
 Silas Young

Results

Night 1 - Milwaukee, WI

Night 2 - Hopkins, MN

(*) - Roderick Strong had qualified to advance to the tournament final, but could not wrestle due to a concussion, making it a five-way match.

Order of Elimination
 Silas Young was eliminated by ACH
 ACH was eliminated by Christopher Daniels
 Christopher Daniels was eliminated by Jay Briscoe
 Jay Briscoe was eliminated by Michael Elgin

References

2015 in professional wrestling
Professional wrestling in Minnesota
Events in Milwaukee
Events in Minnesota
2015 in Wisconsin
2015 in Minnesota
ROH Survival of the Fittest
Professional wrestling in Milwaukee
November 2015 events in the United States